Sainte-Irène is a parish municipality in Quebec, Canada.

Municipal council
 Mayor: Sébastien Lévesque
 Councillors: Nathalie Daoust, Charli Fournier, Carmen Fournier, Nancy Lizotte, Alain Delisle, Nelson Thériault

Political representation 

Provincially it is part of the riding of Matane-Matapédia. In the 2022 Quebec general election the incumbent MNA Pascal Bérubé, of the Parti Québécois, was re-elected to represent the population of Sainte-Irène in the National Assembly of Quebec.

Federally, Sainte-Irène is part of the federal riding of Avignon—La Mitis—Matane—Matapédia. In the 2021 Canadian federal election, the incumbent Kristina Michaud of the Bloc Québécois was re-elected to represent the population Sainte-Irène in the House of Commons of Canada.

Demographics 

See also
 List of parish municipalities in Quebec

References

Parish municipalities in Quebec
Incorporated places in Bas-Saint-Laurent
La Matapédia Regional County Municipality